Enrique José Hernández González (born August 24, 1991) is a Puerto Rican professional baseball utility player for the Boston Red Sox of Major League Baseball (MLB). His nickname is Kike . He previously played in MLB for the Houston Astros, Miami Marlins and Los Angeles Dodgers. He has played every position except catcher in the major leagues, though he has spent the most time in the outfield and second base. The Astros drafted Hernández in the sixth round of the 2009 MLB draft, and he was called up to the majors for the first time in 2014.

Early life
Hernández is the eldest child of Enrique Hernández Sr., a scout for the Pittsburgh Pirates, and his wife Mónica González, owner of a boutique in Toa Baja, Puerto Rico. His mother is Cuban. He has two younger sisters. He began playing baseball at age six and participated in international youth tournaments in Venezuela and the Dominican Republic.

Amateur career
Hernández attended high school at the American Military Academy in Bayamón, Puerto Rico. Though he was 5 feet 6 inches tall in his junior year, he grew five inches in his senior year.

Professional career

Houston Astros
The Houston Astros drafted Hernández in the sixth round of the 2009 Major League Baseball draft. He earned a $150,000 signing bonus. In 2009, he played primarily second base and third base, and in 2010, he played exclusively second base.

Hernández was called up to the majors for the first time on July 1, 2014. He made his major league debut the same day, entering a game against the Seattle Mariners as a defensive replacement in the seventh inning and collecting two hits, the first of which was a ground-rule double in his first at-bat, off Dominic Leone of the Mariners. Hernández hit his first home run the following day, off Chris Young of the Mariners. In 24 games, he hit .284/.348/.420 for the Astros.

Miami Marlins
On July 31, 2014, the Astros traded Hernández, Jarred Cosart, and Austin Wates to the Miami Marlins for Jake Marisnick, Colin Moran, Francis Martes, and a compensatory draft pick. Playing for the Marlins on September 26, 2014, Hernández hit a ninth-inning grand slam off Craig Stammen of the Washington Nationals for his first career grand slam in the major leagues. Overall, Hernández appeared in 18 games for the Marlins and batted .175/.267/.425 (seven hits in 40 at bats).

Los Angeles Dodgers

2015–2017
On December 10, 2014, Hernández was traded to the Los Angeles Dodgers along with Chris Hatcher, Austin Barnes, and Andrew Heaney, in exchange for Dan Haren, Dee Gordon, Miguel Rojas, and cash. He was assigned to the AAA Oklahoma City Dodgers and was recalled by the Los Angeles Dodgers on April 28, 2015. He was used all over the field, with 20 games at second base, 19 in center field, 17 in left field, 16 at shortstop, 2 in right field and one at third base. In August, Hernández replaced a slumping Joc Pederson as the primary starting center fielder, though he missed much of September with a hamstring strain. He played in 76 games for the team in 2015, batting .307/.346/.490, with seven homers and 22 RBI. In 2015 he led all MLB hitters (60 or more plate appearances) in batting average against left-handers, at .423. During the season, he was known for his sense of humor and for wearing a banana suit in the dugout during games in which he was not playing.

In 2016, Hernández was less effective, hitting only .190/.283/.324 with seven homers and 18 RBI in 109 games. He was left off the roster for the first round of the playoffs and was hitless in eight at-bats in the 2016 National League Championship Series.

In 2017, he batted .215/.308/.421 in 297 at bats with 11 home runs and 37 RBIs, while playing at least one inning at every position except pitcher or catcher. In the 2017 National League Division Series, he had one hit, a double, in three at-bats. In the fifth game of the 2017 National League Championship Series, he hit three home runs, including a grand slam, and drove in seven runs to tie the record for most RBI in a postseason game, helping send the Dodgers to the World Series for the first time since 1988. In the World Series, he had three hits in 13 at-bats (.231 average) as the Dodgers lost to the Houston Astros in seven games.

2018–2020
Hernández was eligible for salary arbitration for the first time after the season, and in January 2018 signed a one-year, $1.6 million, contract for 2018.

On July 25, 2018, Hernández pitched in a game for the first time in his career, entering in the 16th inning against the  Philadelphia Phillies and picking up the loss after walking two batters and giving up a three-run walk-off home run. He is the first position player since Babe Ruth to play in the infield, outfield and give up three runs or more in the same game. He is also the first position player ever to give up a walk-off home run. For the season, he batted .256/.336/.470, hitting a career high 21 home runs and 52 RBIs. In the postseason, he was two for 12 in the NLDS against the Atlanta Braves, one for 14 in the NLCS against the Milwaukee Brewers and two for 15 in the 2018 World Series against the Boston Red Sox, with one home run.

On April 19, 2019, Hernández became the first player to hit a home run off Josh Hader when the count was 0-2. The Milwaukee Brewers pitcher had gone up 0-2 on 82 batters previously and held them to a .049 batting average. On August 22, 2019, Hernandez hit his first career walk-off hit in the team's 3-2 win against the Toronto Blue Jays. He would finish the season batting .237/.304/.411 with 17 home runs and a career-high 62 RBIs.

Prior to the 2020 season, Hernández agreed with the Dodgers on a one-year, $5.9 million, contract, avoiding arbitration. On July 23, 2020, Hernandez drove in five runs in an Opening Day 8–1 win against the San Francisco Giants. He played in 48 games during the Dodgers' pandemic-shortened 2020 season, hitting .230/.270/.410 with five home runs and 20 RBIs. He was hitless in five at-bats in the 2020 NLDS. In Game 7 of the 2020 National League Championship Series, Hernandez hit a game-tying solo home run in the sixth inning. With the homerun, Hernandez also became the first player to pinch hit a game-tying or go-ahead home run in a winner-take-all postseason game. Overall, he had 14 at-bats in the series, with four hits (two of them home runs). In the 2020 World Series against the Tampa Bay Rays, Hernandez had two hits in 10 at-bats as the Dodgers won the championship.

Hernández was the last Dodger to wear number 14 before it was retired for Gil Hodges on June 4, 2022.

Boston Red Sox
On February 2, 2021, Hernández signed a two-year, $14 million contract with the Boston Red Sox. He began the season as Boston's primary center fielder, while also seeing time at second base. On May 7, Hernández was placed on the 10-day injured list with a right hamstring strain. On May 17, he played for the Worcester Red Sox on a rehabilitation assignment. He hit two home runs in the game, including the first grand slam in the team's history. Hernández returned to Boston's lineup the following day. He was named the AL Player of the Week after hitting .400 with nine RBIs during July 19–25. Hernández missed several games from late August into early September due to being on the COVID-related injured list. Overall during the regular season, Hernández played in 134 games for Boston, batting .250 with 20 home runs and 60 RBIs. He also appeared in 11 postseason games, batting 20-for-49 (.408). On October 11, Hernandez hit a sacrifice fly in Game 4 of the ALDS to send the Red Sox to the  American League Championship Series. During the final three games of the Division Series and first two games of the League Championship Series, Hernández set a new MLB record for the most total bases in a five-game playoff span, with 34; it also set a new Red Sox franchise record for the most total bases in any five-game span.

Hernández was Boston's starting center fielder for Opening Day in 2022. He missed the game of May 6 due to briefly being on the COVID-related list. On June 8, he was placed on the 10-day injured list due to a right hip flexor strain. On July 23, he was transferred to the 60-day injured list. He rejoined the team on August 16. On September 6, the Red Sox announced that Hernández signed a one-year, $10 million contract extension for the 2023 season. For the 2022 season, Hernández played in 93 games for Boston while batting .222 with six home runs and 45 RBIs.

International career
Hernández played for the Puerto Rico national baseball team in the 2017 World Baseball Classic, where he won a silver medal.

On October 29, 2018, he was selected to form part of the MLB All-Star team for the 2018 MLB Japan All-Star Series. 

In October 2022, it was announced that Hernandez would once again represent Team Puerto Rico in the 2023 World Baseball Classic.

Personal life
Hernández and his wife, Mariana, married in December 2019 in San Juan, Puerto Rico. They welcomed a daughter in January 2021.

See also
 List of Major League Baseball players from Puerto Rico

Notes

References

External links

1991 births
Living people
Major League Baseball infielders
Major League Baseball outfielders
Major League Baseball players from Puerto Rico
Houston Astros players
Miami Marlins players
Los Angeles Dodgers players
Boston Red Sox players
Arizona League Dodgers players
Corpus Christi Hooks players
Gigantes de Carolina players
Gulf Coast Astros players
Lancaster JetHawks players
Leones de Ponce players
Lexington Legends players
New Orleans Zephyrs players
Oklahoma City Dodgers players
Oklahoma City RedHawks players
Rancho Cucamonga Quakes players
Tri-City ValleyCats players
Tulsa Drillers players
Worcester Red Sox players
2017 World Baseball Classic players
2023 World Baseball Classic players
Puerto Rican people of Cuban descent